The European Library is an Internet service that allows access to the resources of 49 European national libraries and an increasing number of research libraries. Searching is free and delivers metadata records as well as digital objects, mostly free of charge. The objects come from institutions located in countries which are members of the Council of Europe and range from catalogue records to full-text books, magazines, journals and audio recordings. Over 200 million records are searchable, including 24 million pages of full-text content and more than 7 million digital objects. Thirty five different languages are represented among the searchable objects.

The content of the European Library was frozen on 31 December 2016, with no new updates after that date.

History and concept
The European Library of today has evolved from a number of earlier projects.

Its starting point was in 1997 when the GABRIEL (Gateway and Bridge to Europe's National Libraries) project set out to establish a joint web portal of European national libraries. At a basic level, the portal provided information about each library's collections and access to their online public access catalogues (OPACs).

GABRIEL was followed by the TEL (The European Library) project, which ran from 2001 to 2004 and created a framework for access to key national and deposit collections within Europe. The project was part-funded under the Fifth Framework Programme of the European Commission. The national libraries involved in the TEL project were those of Finland, Germany, Italy (Florence), Italy (Rome), Netherlands, Portugal, Slovenia, Switzerland and United Kingdom.

This led to the launch of TheEuropeanLibrary.org portal on 17 March 2005.

Between 2005 and 2007, the TEL-ME-MOR project helped to incorporate 10 more national libraries from new European Union member states as full partners of The European Library. By the beginning of 2008, a further nine national libraries within the European Union and the European Free Trade Association had joined the service.

The European Library took a further step towards its enlargement with the EDLproject, during which national libraries continued to join The European Library. The project also focused on multilingualism, undertook the first steps towards a European Metadata Registry and created a roadmap for potential digitization efforts in the national libraries.

The European Library and Europeana

The European Library provided much of the organization and support required to launch Europeana – a European Commission initiative that makes millions of digital objects from libraries, museums and archives accessible to the public via the Europeana website.

When the European Parliament called for Europeana to be established, the Conference of European National Librarians (CENL), under the auspices of the National Library of the Netherlands and CENL's service The European Library, were asked to submit for a project under the eContentplus programme. Work began on a prototype in 2007 and Europeana was launched in November 2008.

Europeana now operates independently but The European Library continues to work closely with Europeana. The European Library is the aggregator of digital content from national libraries for Europeana and delivers digital content from national libraries on a monthly basis to Europeana.

As of July 2012, The European Library was the second biggest content provider to Europeana, with 3.45 million items added to the Europeana database.

Some human and technical resources are also shared between Europeana and The European Library.

Virtual exhibitions

In addition to its search engine, The European Library pulls together themes from the collections of Europe's national libraries and displays them in virtual exhibitions. These exhibitions unite geographically disparate objects in a single online space, offering Pan-European sources on the topic.

Manuscripts and Princes in Medieval and Renaissance Europe: 34 manuscripts from the royal collections of the Carolingian Emperors, French King Charles V and his family, and the Aragonese kings of Naples.
Travelling Through History: Centuries worth of travel memorabilia from 13 European libraries, including photographs, sounds, maps and books.
Reading Europe: Almost 1,000 books selected by national libraries, with curatorial information and full-text versions in most cases.
A Roma Journey: Texts, photographs, paintings and recordings of traditional songs showing the heritage of the Romani people in Europe.
Napoleonic Wars: A selection of portraits, military maps, city plans, letters, books and other material from the Napoleonic Wars.
Treasures of Europe's National Libraries: A collection of objects selected by Europe's national libraries as some of the most outstanding items in their collections.
National Library Buildings: Images of the National Libraries that are partners of The European Library.

Financing and ownership

The European Library is financed by its owners, the Conference of European National Librarians (CENL). The portal is maintained by The European Library Office located in the premises of the Dutch Royal Library in The Hague. Its programme director is Jill Cousins.

Partner libraries
The 48 National Libraries who participate in The European Library project are:

Albania: Biblioteka Kombëtare e Shqipërisë
Armenia: Հայաստանի Ազգային գրադարան
Austria: Österreichische Nationalbibliothek
Azerbaijan: Mirzə Fətəli Axundov adına Azərbaycan Milli Kitabxanası
Belgium: Koninklijke Bibliotheek België
Bosnia and Herzegovina: Nacionalna i univerzitetska biblioteka Bosne i Hercegovine
Bulgaria: Национална библиотека „Свети Свети Кирил и Методий
Croatia: Nacionalna i sveučilišna knjižnica u Zagrebu
Cyprus: Κυπριακή Βιβλιοθήκη
Czech Republic: Národní knihovna České republiky
Denmark: Det Kongelige Bibliotek
Estonia: Eesti Rahvusraamatukogu
Finland: Kansalliskirjasto
France: Bibliothèque nationale de France
Georgia: საქართველოს პარლამენტის ეროვნული ბიბლიოთეკა
Germany: German National Library
Greece: Εθνική Βιβλιοθήκη
Hungary: Országos Széchényi Könyvtár
Iceland: Landsbókasafn Íslands – Háskólabókasafn
Ireland: Leabharlann Náisiúnta na hÉireann
Italy-Florence: Biblioteca Nazionale Centrale di Firenze
Italy-Rome: Biblioteca Nazionale Centrale
Latvia: Latvijas Nacionālā bibliotēka
Liechtenstein: Liechtensteinische Landesbibliothek

Lithuania: Lietuvos nacionalinė Martyno Mažvydo biblioteka
Luxembourg: Bibliothèque nationale de Luxembourg
Macedonia: Национална и универзитетска библиотека „Св. Климент Охридски"
Malta: Bibljoteka Nazzjonali ta' Malta
Moldova: Biblioteca Naţională a Republicii Moldova
Montenegro: Centralna narodna biblioteka Crne Gore
Netherlands: Koninklijke Bibliotheek
Norway: Nasjonalbiblioteket
Poland: Biblioteka Narodowa
Portugal: Biblioteca Nacional de Portugal
Romania: Biblioteca Naţională a României
Russia-Moscow: Российская государственная библиотека
Russia-St.Petersburg: Rossiiskaya Natsionalnaya Biblioteka
San Marino: Biblioteca di Stato e Beni Librari
Serbia: Народна библиотека Србије / Narodna biblioteka Srbije
Slovakia: Slovenská národná knižnica
Slovenia: Narodna in univerzitetna knjižnica
Spain: Biblioteca Nacional de España
Sweden: Kungliga biblioteket
Switzerland: Swiss National Library
Turkey: Millî Kütüphane
Ukraine: Національна бібліотека України імені В.І. Вернадського
United Kingdom: British Library
Vatican City: Bibliotheca Apostolica Vaticana

Research Libraries who have also contributed content to The European Library as a result of the Europeana Libraries project include:

Bavarian State Library
Belgrade University Library
Hungarian Parliament Library
National Library of Wales
Romanian Academy Library
Trinity College Dublin
Universidad Complutense de Madrid
University of Berne
University College London
University of Ghent

University of Leuven
University of Lund
University of Oxford
University of Sibiu
University of Tartu Library
University of Uppsala
University of Vienna
Wellcome Trust Library
Zentralbibliothek Zürich

See also

Europeana
Virtual Centre for Knowledge on Europe

References

External links
 The European Library at Europeana
 Conference of European National Librarians (CENL)
 Europeana Libraries

 Europe
Dutch digital libraries
Internet and the European Union
Cultural policies of the European Union
Aggregation-based digital libraries
Multilingual websites